Penrod is a 1922 American comedy film directed by Marshall Neilan and written by Lucita Squier. It is based on the 1914 novel Penrod by Booth Tarkington. The film stars Wesley Barry, Tully Marshall, Claire McDowell, John Harron, Gordon Griffith and Newton Hall. The film was released on February 20, 1922, by Associated First National Pictures.

Plot
Penrod Schofield is a mischievous boy who makes trouble in his community by protecting kids from overprotective and strict parents. He leads American Boys' Protective Association (ABPA) which engages in local society disruptions. People from his society are becoming frustrated with his behavior and when the town's outlaws arrive, Penrod shows his true color.

Cast       
Wesley Barry as Penrod
Tully Marshall as Mr. Schofield
Claire McDowell as Mrs. Schofield
John Harron as Robert Williams
Gordon Griffith as Sam Williams
Newton Hall as George Bassett
Harry Griffith as Foster
Cecil Holland as John Barrett
Ernie Morrison as Herman
Florence Morrison as Verman
Marjorie Daw as Margaret
Clara Horton as Marjorie Jones
Peggy Jane as Baby Rennsdale

Preservation
The film is now considered lost.

References

External links
 

1922 films
1920s English-language films
Silent American comedy films
First National Pictures films
Films directed by Marshall Neilan
American silent feature films
American black-and-white films
1922 lost films
Lost American films
1922 comedy films
Lost comedy films
1920s American films